Exchange of Hearts is the debut album by American singer-songwriter David Slater. It was released in 1988 on Capitol Records, and produced by Randy Scruggs. The album reached the top 40 on the Billboard Top Country Albums chart, peaking at number 33. Three of its singles charted on the Billboard Hot Country Songs chart, with the first two singles, "I'm Still Your Fool" and "The Other Guy" (Little River Band cover) reaching the top 40 at numbers 36 and 30, respectively. The third single from the album is a cover of the 1980 Jim Photoglo song "We Were Meant to Be Lovers"; this version reached number 63 on the Hot Country Songs chart.

Track listing

References

1988 debut albums
Capitol Records albums